M/V Aranui 3 is a dual passenger/cargo vessel that operated between Tahiti and the Marquesas Islands. With a homeport of Papeete, French Polynesia, Aranui 3 is registered as a passenger ship under the International Convention for the Safety of Life at Sea (SOLAS), for international operation.

Constructed in Romania and entered service in 2003, Auraui 3 ended her French Polynesia voyages on 4 December 2015 and was replaced by the Aranui 5 for the 12 December 2015 inaugural sailing.

Apart from supplying cargo to the six ports in the Marquesas Islands, Aranui 3 also operates a passenger service and tourist cruise as part of its 14-day itinerary. It also stops at the islands of Rangiroa and Fakarava in the Tuamotu Islands.

The Aranui 3 ended service in Tahiti in 2015 and was replaced by the Aranui 5 who continues to service the route.

References

External links 
Aranui The Official Site

Expedition cruising
2002 ships
Cruise ships
Marquesas Islands
Tahiti